706 Hirundo (prov. designation:  or ) is an elongated background asteroid, located in the central region of the asteroid belt. It was discovered by German astronomer Joseph Helffrich at the Heidelberg Observatory on 9 October 1910. It was named after the bird genus Hirundo, commonly known as swallows.

Orbit and classification 

Hirundo is a non-family asteroid of the main belt's background population when applying the hierarchical clustering method to its proper orbital elements.

It orbits the Sun in the central asteroid belt at a distance of 2.2–3.3 AU once every 4 years and 6 months (1,647 days; semi-major axis of 2.73 AU). Its orbit has an eccentricity of 0.19 and an inclination of 14° with respect to the ecliptic. The body's observation arc begins at Vienna Observatory on 16 October 1910, or six nights after its official discovery observation by Joseph Helffrich at Heidelberg.

Naming 

This minor planet was named after bird genus Hirundo, a group of passerines in the family Hirundinidae (swallows and martins). "Hirundo" is Latin word for swallow. They are found all over the world with the exception of New Zealand and the polar regions. Known for their graceful flight and regular migrations, swallows feature a short bill with a wide gape, small weak feet, and typically a deeply forked tail. They feed on insects caught on the wing. The  was mentioned in The Names of the Minor Planets by Paul Herget in 1955.

Physical characteristics 

In both the Bus–Binzel (SMASS-II) and the Bus–DeMeo classification, Hirundo is a carbonaceous C-type asteroid (Cgh).

Rotation period and poles 

In September 2000, a rotational lightcurve of Hirundo was obtained from photometric observations by American Brian Warner at the Palmer Divide Observatory  in Colorado. Lightcurve analysis gave a rotation period of  hours with a high brightness variation of  magnitude, indicative of an elongated shape.

Each modeled lightcurve also determined two spin axes of (92°, 66°) and (244°, 54°), as well as (91°, 70°) and (250°, 45°) in ecliptic coordinates (λ, β), respectively.

Diameter and albedo 

The Collaborative Asteroid Lightcurve Link derives an albedo of 0.0853 and a diameter of 28.70 kilometers based on an absolute magnitude of 11.

Notes

References

External links 
 Lightcurve Database Query (LCDB), at www.minorplanet.info
 Dictionary of Minor Planet Names, Google books
 Asteroids and comets rotation curves, CdR – Geneva Observatory, Raoul Behrend
 Discovery Circumstances: Numbered Minor Planets (1)-(5000) – Minor Planet Center
 
 

000706
Discoveries by Joseph Helffrich
Named minor planets
000706
19101009